Charbel Georges (born 28 September 1993) is a Swedish professional footballer descent who plays as a midfielder for Swedish club Hammarby TFF.

Georges is of Assyrian descent; he is the maternal nephew of Sharbel Touma and cousin of Jimmy Durmaz.

References

External links
 Charbel Georges at SvFF
 
 Charbel Georges at Fotbolltransfers

1993 births
Living people
Swedish people of Assyrian/Syriac descent
Swedish people of Syrian descent
Swedish footballers
Association football midfielders
Syrianska FC players
IK Sirius Fotboll players
Arameisk-Syrianska IF players
Mjällby AIF players
Vasalunds IF players
Hammarby Talang FF players
Superettan players
Allsvenskan players
Ettan Fotboll players
Assyrian footballers
Syrian Christians
Syriac Orthodox Christians